Ana Roman (born 13 November 1975) is a Romanian biathlete. She competed in the women's relay event at the 1994 Winter Olympics.

References

1975 births
Living people
Biathletes at the 1994 Winter Olympics
Romanian female biathletes
Olympic biathletes of Romania
Place of birth missing (living people)